The Régiment de Soissonnais has a long history in the French armed forces.  They fought at the Battle of Fontenoy 1745 and the Battle of Yorktown (1781) during the American Revolution.

References

Military units and formations established in the 1590s
Military units and formations disestablished in 1791
Military units and formations of France in the American Revolutionary War
Line infantry regiments of the Ancien Régime